Kevin Scott (born May 19, 1969) is a former professional American football cornerback in the National Football League. He played four seasons for the Detroit Lions. He attended Stanford University where he was an All-Pac 10 1st team selection as a Defensive Back. He was chosen by the Detroit Lions with the 91st pick in the 4th round. He played four seasons with the Lions. His career included stops in Denver, Chicago, NFL Europe-Scotland Claymores, XFL-Las Vegas Outlaws, AFL-Detroit Fury and CFL-Toronto Argonauts.

1969 births
Living people
Players of American football from Phoenix, Arizona
American football cornerbacks
Stanford Cardinal football players
Detroit Lions players
Scottish Claymores players
Las Vegas Outlaws (XFL) players
Detroit Fury players
Toronto Argonauts players